Przemyslaw Mazur (born 23 May 1978 in Cracow, Poland ) is a Polish rally codriver.

Biography
One of the most experienced rally codrivers in Poland. His Rally career he began in 1998 and since the end of 2011 he has started in more than 100 rallies counted to the Polish Rally Championship and the European Rally Championship. Over the years, he finished successful many rallies with different drivers: Grzegorz Grzyb, Maciej Lubiak, Leszek Kuzaj and now Maciej Rzeznik. During the rally career has started following cars:
 
 WRC class: Citroen Xsara WRC, Citroen C4 WRC, Skoda Fabia WRC 
 S2000 class: Fiat Grande Punto S2000, Skoda Fabia S2000, S2000 Peugeot 207 
 N4/R4 class: Mitsubishi Lancer Evo IX, Mitsubishi Lancer Evo X
 S1600 class: Peugeot 206 S1600, Suzuki Ignis S1600

Przemek Mazur lent his voice as a co-driver in a computer game "Rally Poland" issued by IQ Publishing.

Rally career 
2013
Vice-champion of Polish Rally Championship  Overall Classification 
Vice-champion of Polish Rally Championship  Class 2 Classification 
2011
Vice-champion of Central Europe Zone  S2000 Classification 
2010
2nd Vice-champion of Slovakia S2000 Classification
2009
Vice-champion of Slovakia Overall Classification
2008
2nd Vice-champion of Central Europe Zone  
2nd Vice-champion of Slovakia Overall Classification
Vice-champion of Slovakia N4 class
2007
Fiat-Castrol Rally Team codriver
2005
Vice-champion of Slovakia Overall Classification 
Vice-champion of Slovakia S1600 Classification
2004
Champion of Poland in S1600 classification 
2003
Champion of Poland in S1600 classification 
2000
Vice-champion of Poland in Peugeot 106 Rallye Cup

Mountain career
He has already climbed following Seven Summits series mountains:

Mont Blanc (4810 metres above sea level, Alps)
Elbrus (5642 metres above sea level, Caucasus)
Aconcagua (6962 metres above sea level, Andes)
Kilimanjaro (5895 metres above sea level, Kilimanjaro)

Education 
Higher Education: Polish Open University. 
Title of qualification awarded: MBA by Oxford Brookes University

References

External links
 Przemyslaw Mazur - Official site

1978 births
Living people
Polish rally drivers
Sportspeople from Kraków